Lukáš Dlouhý and Leander Paes were the defending champions, but Paes decided not to participate that year. Dlouhý partnered with David Škoch, but they lost in the first round against Eric Butorac and Rajeev Ram. Butorac and Ram won in the final 7–6(7–4), 6–3, against Guillermo García-López and Mischa Zverev.

Seeds

Draw

Draw

External links
Main Draw

Doubles
PTT Thailand Open - Doubles
 in Thai tennis